Snaps are a brand of classic chewy candy, manufactured by American Licorice Company. They have hollow centers and are colored white, orange, green, and pink.

External links
 Snaps @ American Licorice Company

American Licorice Company brands
Liquorice (confectionery)
American confectionery